Centreville Township was a township that existed from 1822 to 1829 in Salem County, New Jersey, United States.

The township was incorporated by an Act of the New Jersey Legislature on March 4, 1822, from portions of Pittsgrove Township. Just short of its seventh anniversary, the township was dissolved and its territory restored to Pittsgrove Township from whence it came.

References

1822 establishments in New Jersey
1829 disestablishments
Populated places established in 1822
Former municipalities in Salem County, New Jersey
Former townships in New Jersey